Cowtown Coliseum is a 3,418-seat arena in Fort Worth, Texas, United States. It hosts weekly rodeos. It also hosted local sporting events and concerts. 

The venue was built in 1908 and was refurbished in 1986. Elvis Presley once performed there. Part of the historic Fort Worth Stockyards, the structure is the first ever indoor arena for rodeos in the United States.

In 2007, it hosted the Fort Worth Sixers of the National Indoor Football League.

The Stockyards Championship Rodeo is held at the Coliseum almost every Friday and Saturday.

The Professional Bull Riders (PBR) held their very first event in April 1993 at Cowtown Coliseum. In late December 1993, the venue would be the first stop of the PBR Bud Light Cup Series’ 1994 inaugural season. In February 2021, the PBR’s elite series, now known as the Unleash the Beast Series, returned to Cowtown Coliseum for the first time since 1993 to host an event. The PBR’s Touring Pro Division has hosted the Cowtown Classic at the Coliseum every New Year’s Eve/New Year’s Day for several years. In 2022, the PBR’s Challenger Series hosted Sunday events known as PBR Sundays at Cowtown at the venue from June through August. Since 2023, the PBR hosts lower-level events known as Stockyards Showcase at the Coliseum on most Thursdays of the calendar year. These events are the kickoff to the Friday and Saturday Stockyards Championship Rodeo. 

The Coliseum also houses the Bull Riding Hall of Fame.

External links
Venue Homepage

References

Indoor arenas in Texas
Sports venues in Fort Worth, Texas
American football venues in the Dallas–Fort Worth metroplex
Rodeo venues in the United States